Marvin Methodist Episcopal Church, South (also called Marvin United Methodist Church and Marvin Church) is a historic church at 300 W. Erwin Street in Tyler, Texas.

It was built in 1890 and added to the National Register of Historic Places in 2000.

See also

National Register of Historic Places listings in Smith County, Texas
Recorded Texas Historic Landmarks in Smith County

References

External links

United Methodist churches in Texas
Churches on the National Register of Historic Places in Texas
Gothic Revival church buildings in Texas
1890s architecture in the United States
Churches in Smith County, Texas
National Register of Historic Places in Smith County, Texas
Recorded Texas Historic Landmarks